Pignataro may refer to:

Pignataro Interamna, in the Province of Frosinone, Lazio, Italy
Pignataro Maggiore, in the Province of Caserta, Campania, Italy
Roberto L. Pignataro (1928-2008), Argentine abstract artist